Dar El Agha Mosque is an ancient Tunisian mosque that was located in the north of the Medina of Tunis.

Localization 
The mosque was in the Agha street.

Etymology 
The mosque and the street got their name from the agha, a military commandant of the Ottoman era, who had a house in the same street.

History 
We don't have enough information about the construction date of the mosque. However, we know that the last agha who lived in the house was Abou El Abbes Ahmed El Kbir (Arabic : أبو العباس أحمد الكبير). Afterwards, cheikh 's children possessed the house. The mosque may have been constructed during the period of Ottoman rule in Tunis.

References 
Content in this edit is translated from the existing Arabic Wikipedia article at :ar:مسجد دار الآغة; see its history for attribution.

Bibliography 

Mosques in the medina of Tunis